Goldwind Australia is the Australian subsidiary of Chinese company Goldwind that builds, owns and operates wind farms and solar farms in Australia.

Wind and solar farms

References

External links 

Renewable energy companies of Australia